Watsi, legally Watsi, Inc., is a nonprofit healthcare crowdsourcing platform that enables individual donors to directly fund medical care for individuals in developing countries without access to affordable medical care.

Background 
Watsi was the first nonprofit funded by seed accelerator Y Combinator. They have also been funded by the Draper Richards Kaplan Foundation.

In November 2015 the company announced a $3.5M growth round of donations led by 12 investors including Paul Graham, Tencent, and The Pershing Square Foundation.

Medical partners included Nyaya Health, Dr. Rick Hodes, Wuqu' Kawoq, Children's Surgical Centre, CURE International, African Mission Healthcare Foundation, Hope for West Africa, Project Muso, Lwala Community Alliance, Living Hope Haiti, Floating Doctors, Burma Border Projects, Partner for Surgery, International Care Ministries, The Kellermann Foundation, and World Altering Medicine.

In 2014, Watsi's old logo, which had a blue cross with a white triangle, was the subject of a trademark suit from the Blue Cross Blue Shield Association, leading the company to change their logo to white triangles on a blue circle.

References

External links 

Crowdfunding platforms of the United States
Health charities in the United States
Non-profit organizations based in San Francisco
Organizations established in 2011
Y Combinator companies
Medical and health organizations based in California
Online nonprofit organizations
501(c)(3) organizations
2011 establishments in the United States